Leben zu zweit is an East German comedy film. It was released in 1968.

References

External links
 

1968 films
East German films
1960s German-language films
1968 comedy films
Films directed by Herrmann Zschoche
1960s German films